The A. Kinney House is a historic house located in Southbridge, Massachusetts.

Description and history 
It is an excellent local example of a mid 19th century house with transitional Greek Revival and Italianate styling. Its basic form, a three wide, side hall layout, is classically Greek Revival, but its exterior includes Italianate details such as round-arch gable windows and bracketing in the cornice, gable and porch areas. Nothing is known of its owner, identified on period maps as A. Kinney.

The house was listed on the National Register of Historic Places in 1989. It now houses a funeral home.

See also
National Register of Historic Places listings in Southbridge, Massachusetts
National Register of Historic Places listings in Worcester County, Massachusetts

References

External links
 A. Kinney House MACRIS Listing

Houses in Southbridge, Massachusetts
Houses completed in 1865
National Register of Historic Places in Southbridge, Massachusetts
Houses on the National Register of Historic Places in Worcester County, Massachusetts
Italianate architecture in Massachusetts
Greek Revival houses in Massachusetts